Stark Industries, later also known as Stark International, Stark Innovations, Stark Enterprises and Stark Resilient, is a fictional company appearing in American comic books published by Marvel Comics. Created by Robert Bernstein, Stan Lee, and Jack Kirby, the company first appeared in Tales of Suspense #39 (April 1962). Stark Industries is depicted as being owned and run by businessman and namesake Tony Stark, who is also known as Iron Man, and was founded by Tony's father, Howard Stark.

In the Marvel Cinematic Universe, Stark Industries has a logo modeled after the defense contractor Lockheed Martin and is listed on the New York Stock Exchange as SIA.  During the press conference scene, Stark is seen entering a building that resembles the entrance to Lockheed Martin's Skunk Works facility.  An airplane extremely similar to the Lockheed YF-22 stood as a statue in front of the Stark Industries facility, exactly like the prototypes on display at Skunk Works facility in Palmdale, California.

Publication history 
Stark Industries first appeared in Tales of Suspense #40 (April 1963), created by Robert Bernstein, Stan Lee, and Jack Kirby.

History
Stark Industries was founded by Isaac Stark, Sr. in the 19th century and later taken over by Howard Stark and then by his son Tony, after his death. Over the years, through bankruptcy, Tony's "death", Tony's return and hostile takeovers, the company has gone through many name changes including Stark International (later Stane International), Stark Enterprises, Stark/Fujikawa and Stark Solutions.

Stark Industries

Functions
Stark Industries is primarily a defense company that develops and manufactures advanced weapons and military technologies. The company manufactures the armor worn by Iron Man and War Machine. It builds the helicarriers used by S.H.I.E.L.D, and it produces the Quinjets used by the Avengers

Staff
 Tony Stark – Chairman of Stark Industries
 Obadiah Stane – Executive Officer (deceased)
 Happy Hogan – Former head of Security 
 Pepper Potts – CEO 
 Dr. Gray Armond – Head Designer.
 Harmon Furmintz – Member of Stark Industries' biochemical division. He worked for Genetech and was born around 1918. He was a child prodigy and recruited as candidate for Super Soldier Project, but was rejected due to having hemophilia. He attempted to gain the power of Terrax, but his body and mind were destroyed by Shafear and reformed into duplicate of his own.
 Jacob Fury (Scorpio) – Former research scientist.
 Sally McIntyre
 Eddie March – Former part of the Iron Legion.
 Kevin O’Bryan
 Ralph Roberts
 Anton Vanko (Crimson Dynamo) — Former Head Scientist and Chief Developer (deceased)
 Arwyn Zurrow – Head of the Miami facilities.

Subsidiaries
 Project: Caribbean (staff unknown)  – Stark Industries made an effort to start a plant in Haiti, however it was destroyed by Night Phantom.

Stark International
Originally Stark Industries, the name was changed when the company ceased manufacturing munitions, with Tony handing over the CEO position to Pepper Potts. Eventually, the company was taken over by Obadiah Stane after a hostile takeover and he renamed it Stane International.

Staff
 Tony Stark – Original Head
 James Rupert Rhodes – Pilot, later Acting CEO
 Bambi Arbogast – An executive assistant.
 Yvette Avril – Worked for the French branch of Stark International and was brought to the US to become vice president of the Long Island facility. She unsuccessfully attempted to save the company when Tony Stark went on a major drinking binge and quit after takeover by Obadiah Stane.
 Bethany Cabe – 
 Dianne Carruthers – 
 Morley Erwin – Owned Circuits Maximus as well as working Stark International. He is the brother of Clytemnestra Erwin. He also assisted Jim Rhodes in learning to use the Iron Man armor, helped form Circuits Maximus, killed when Obadiah Stane had the Circuits Maximus building bombed
 Abe Klein – Director of Engineering. – Tony Stark's old electrical engineering professor. Killed by Mordecai Midas.
 Scott Lang (Ant-Man)
 Kristine "Krissy" Longfellow – Secretary. She posed as Tony Stark's secretary to be close to him without involving him with a criminal.
 Harold Marks (Techno-Killer) – A research technician. He left to work for author James Spencer; built an armor to gain respect and vengeance from perceived lack of appreciation
 Vincent "Vic" Martinelli – A security guard. He was a former soldier and architect who worked for Williams Innovations before working at Stark International. He remained with Obadiah Stane after his hostile takeover due to difficulty in finding a new job.
 Artemus "Artie" Pithins – Director of Public Relations. He is currently a White House Press Secretary. Quit Stark International after Obadiah Stane took over.
 Erica Sondheim – Medical Director.
 Carl Walker – 
 Cherry Wood – A scientist. She studied Doctor Octopus' Adamantium arms and dated Stark. She was taken hostage by Doctor Octopus.

Stane International
After driving Tony Stark back to alcoholism, Obadiah Stane wrested control of Stark International from James Rhodes after a hostile takeover and renamed the company after himself. Stane renewed the munitions manufacturing. However, after Stane was killed, the company was run by a mysterious cartel which was eventually bought out and reabsorbed by Stark Enterprises.

Staff
 Obadiah Stane – CEO of Stane International.
 Joel Arons – He was involved in a project that kidnapped Myron MacLain. He stole Captain America's proto-adamantium shield
 Joseph "Joe" Faulkner – general manager.
 Dr. Edward "Edwin" Earl Hawkins – Designed the Mass Acquisition Unit. He aided Giant Man (Bill Foster) in battling Doctor Nemesis.
 Karaguchi Inoyawa – Sought to rebuild the Red Ronin for peaceful purposes.
 Joseph "Joe" Kilman – After being fired for unknown reasons, he sought revenge by trying to take control of Red Ronin
 Vic Martinelli
 Michael Craig Stockton (Dr. Nemesis) – Sought to coerce Dr. Hawkins into creating a mass acquisition warhead.

Stark Enterprises
After regaining his personal fortune following Obadiah Stane's death, Tony established a new company, Stark Enterprises, in Los Angeles.

Staff
 Tony Stark – CEO and founder (deceased)
 James Rhodes – Former CEO (when Stark was in suspended animation following his first "death"; quit upon Stark's revival); former pilot
 Rothvichet Poch – Former lawyer, vice-president and CEO. Alvarez defended Tony Stark in the trial of Kathy Dare.
 Bambi Arbogast - receptionist and former member of the US Department of Defense.
 Veronica Benning/Victoria Michelle – Tony Stark's physiotherapist.
 Bethany Cabe – Security Chief and former bodyguard of Tony Stark.
 Diane Carruthers – 
 Lee Clayton
 Ed Deal – Worked on the VLS-2980 Project.
 Phillip Grant – Computer hacker.
 Chester "Chet" Harrigan – Former chauffeur to Tony Stark.
 Bert Hindel – Former lawyer of Stark Enterprises. He was fired after he failed to clear up the Government civil suits brought on during the Armor Wars storyline. He also unsuccessfully defended Kathy Dare.
 Happy Hogan – 
 Heuristically Operative-Matrix-Emulation Rostrum (H.O.M.E.R.) – Nearly intelligent computer of Tony Stark.
 Sarah Jennings – Accounts & Marketing
 Kylie Normandy – 
 Dr. Cal Oakley – Former employee of Cordco. Oakley assisted in rebuilding Tony Stark's nervous system following his being shot by Kathy Dare.
 Marcia Jessica "Marcy" Pearson – Former Director of Public Relations and later Vice-President. Rhodes fired her when she resented his being named Stark's successor as CEO.
 Garrison Quint – Chief of security.
 James Simpson – Security guard. He allowed Edgar Elliot to sabotage Tony Stark's experimental rocket.
 Dr. Erica Fredrika Sondheim – Medical Director and former surgeon.
 Wayne Unnier
 Nick Walcek
 Atha Williams – Secretary
 Roderick Withers – Director of Public Relations
 Abraham Paul "Abe" Zimmer – Research director and former member of the board of directors at Acutech. He was killed by Calico.

Subsidiaries
 Accutech – Research and Development company, based in California, that was bought out as a subsidiary. The company produced and designed a Beta Particle Generator which was sabotaged by the Ghost. Known staff members include Gilbert O’Connor and Abe Zimmer.
 Barstow Electronics> – Subsidiary of Stark Enterprises based in California. It employed Carl Walker after Force's faked death.
 Cordco – Bought out by Stark Enterprises to force Dr. Cal Oakley to implant a biochip in Tony Stark's spine after he was shot by Kathy Dare. Known staff members include Addison Drexel, Edwin Cord, Dr. Cal Oakley, and Basil Sandhurst.
 Stane International – It was reacquired by Stark from Justin Hammer, who owned SI following Obidiah Stane's death. The company reproduced Stark's original Guardsman armor for use at the Vault. Much of Stane's operations involved disreputable business practices, leading Stark to initiate a major clean-up effort after reacquiring the company.
 Hot Cup Coffee – Created by Stark using the pseudonym "The Boss".

Stark/Fujikawa
Created by a merger of Stark Enterprises and Fujikawa Industries following apparent death of Iron Man/Anthony Stark.

Staff
 Kenjiro Fujikawa – CEO – founder of Fujikawa Industries, father of Rumiko
 Yu Kurin
 Tobi Kanigawa
 Rumiko Fujikawa  – Daughter of Kenjiro. She was a skilled businesswoman. Played the role of party-girl to annoy her parents. She was slain by an Iron Man impostor named Clarence Ward.
 Morgan Stark – Cousin of Tony Stark. Became general manager of Stark-Fujikawa after Tony's "death".

Subsidiaries
 Fujikawa Industries – The previous version of this company helped form Stark-Fujikawa. A Japanese firm which took over Stark Enterprises following the apparent death of Tony Stark. Known employees include Tso Fwon, Yu Kurin, Tobi Kanigawa and Wilson Fisk.
 Oracle Incorporated – Formed by Namor, the company was sold to Stark-Fujikawa. Formerly served as the headquarters of Heroes for Hire. After Tony's "death", Bambi Arbogast seconded here. Known employees include Caleb Alexander (who was killed), Carrie Alexander, Allison Grain, Jim Hammond (Human Torch), Robert Losey, Kent Maitland, Phoebe Marrs, Leon McKenzie, Namor McKenzie (former CEO), Rihanna O'Connor, Dr. Anita Savvy, Dr. Richard Savvy, Bambi Arbogast, Josef Went and James "Jimbob" Roberts.
 Parallel Conglomerate – Subsidiary of Oracle Inc. (which would make it a subsidiary of Stark-Fujikawa). Known employees are Captain Holten Gamble (who was killed on board an oil tanker owned by Parallel Conglomerate) and Oliver Russell.
 Rand-Meachum – A company formed by Harold Meachum and Wendell Rand, became a subsidiary of Stark-Fujikawa. Known employees include Daniel Rand (Iron Fist), Wendell Rand-K'ai, Leon McKenzie, Harold Meachum, Ward Meachum, Joy Meachum, Jason Quartermaster, Peregrin Took, Martina Tereshkova and Dr. Ilya Faro

Stark Solutions
The fifth company run/owned by Tony Stark and was founded after his return from another dimension. It was shut down by Tony after he was defamed by Tiberius Stone who was subliminally influencing him.

Staff
 Tony Stark – CEO
 Happy Hogan
 Pepper Potts
 Svengoto Eriksson

Stark Industries/International
The sixth company owned/run by/founded by Tony Stark and was set up after the closure of Stark Solutions. After the events of "The Five Nightmares" and "World Most Wanted" story arcs, Stark Industries went bankrupt and eventually closed down. It was also known as Stark International, both names formerly used in previous incarnations of the company. Its logo being the same as the S.I. Logo in the Iron Man film series.

Staff
 Tony Stark – CEO
Laila Stark | iron girl
daughter 
 Joseph Jeremy "Joe" Arnold – One of the Security Department heads.
 David Beaumont – One of the Security Department heads.
 Arturos Benning – One of the Security Department heads
 F.R.I.D.A.Y.
 Happy Hogan – Tony Stark's bodyguard. Killed saving Stark from an assassination attempt
 Michael "Mike" Jochum – One of the Security Department heads.
 Kurt Kennison – One of the Security Department heads.
 Takeshis Kobayashi – Head of Research & Development.
 Archie Merchant – One of the Security Department heads.
 Pepper Potts
 Katherine Rennie – Tony Stark's personal secretary.
 James Rupert Rhodes (War Machine)
 Jack Rutledge – He was involved in the development of a Gamma Radiation Neutralizing Armor. He was later killed by Richard Cummings for covering up the death of Lisa Cummings.
 Ryan Zimm – One of the Security Department heads.
 Gallileo "Leo" Braithwaite
 Jan Kolins
 Svengoto Eriksson – Following closure of Stark Solution, he has been given principal data by Tony Stark and then individually reinvented the AI "Jarvis" and armoury of Iron Man suit. During establishment of Stark Industries, he given the research result to Tony. Tony admired him and said that the new suit is like giving Tony a "Regent".
 Martha Johns
 Geoff Douglat
 Tessa Springfield
 Anna Wei
Dr Dave Allen
 Michael Cline – Supporter
 Horsars Marvel – Supporter

Reception

Accolades 

 In 2011, Forbes ranked Stark Industries 16th in their "25 Largest Fictional Companies" list.
 In 2016, Time ranked Stark Industries 3rd in their "18 Most Influential Fake Companies of All Time" list.
 In 2018, Sideshow ranked Stark Industries 1st in their "Top 10 Superhero Corporations" list.
 In 2019, CBR.com ranked Stark Industries 8th in their "Top 10 Fictional Marvel Companies" list.

Other versions

Marvel 2099
In Marvel 2099 (an alternate future reality set in the year 2099), Stark Fujikawa is a major corporate power, alongside Roxxon. The only known staff members are Hikaru-Sama and Shudo

Ultimate Marvel
Stark Industries also appears in the Ultimate universe, as it keeps mostly the same origin as spawned outta Howard Stark's defense company. As well as Stark International in the Ultimate Comics as a competitor to Mandarin International.

Stark Global Solutions Headquarters also appears as a separate company operated in Singapore owned by Tony Stark's older brother Dr. Gregory Stark.

MC2
In the alternate future reality of MC2, the company is known as Stark Global Industries and is owned and run by Tony Stark.

Earth Ultra-Vision
In a What If story, the company is known as Stark Interplanetary and was the creators of the Irondroids

Amalgam Comics
In the world of Amalgam Comics, the company is known as Stark Aircraft (itself a merger between Stark Industries and Ferris Aircraft). The only known employees are Janice Doremus, Pepper Ferris, Happy Kalmaku, Stewart Rhodes, Hal Stark.

In other media

Television
 Stark Industries was featured in the 1990s Iron Man TV series. In this show, Julia Carpenter (the second Spider-Woman) is also depicted as the head of Stark Industries' Research and Development.
 A Stark Enterprises building can be seen in the X-Men: Evolution episode "On Angels' Wings".
 Stark International is featured in Iron Man: Armored Adventures. After Howard Stark was abducted by the Mandrarin in a plane crash and presumed dead, Obadiah Stane becomes the CEO of Stark Industries. In "Cold War," it is revealed that Blizzard used to work for Stark Industries until an accident caused by Obadiah Stane left him "deformed and destroyed." In "Designed Only for Chaos," Roberta Rhodes revealed to Tony that Stark Industries used to make weapons until Howard Stark stopped their production when Tony was born. In "Heavy Mettle," Obadiah Stane ends up fired by the chairman of the board after Tony Stark and Roberta Rhodes show the board of directors the footage of Obadiah Stane making a deal with Ghost is shown. In "Hostile Takeover," Justin Hammer ends up buying Stark International and sends Sasha to tell Tony Stark that he will no longer inherit the company when he reaches 18. After the fight with Titanium Man, Whiplash, Killer Shrike, and Unicorn, Tony Stark along with Rhodey and Pepper create a company called Stark Solutions. In "The Hammer Falls," Howard Stark returns and manages to reclaim Stark International after Justin Hammer (when soon buy the secret lair of Stark and secret Stark Solutions) is exposed and defeated by Mr. Fix.
 Stark Industries is featured in The Super Hero Squad Show.
 Stark Industries appears in The Avengers: Earth's Mightiest Heroes.
 Stark Industries' Japanese branch appears in Marvel Anime: Iron Man.
 A Stark Industries lab appears in Ultimate Spider-Man episode "Flight of the Iron Spider."
 In the Eureka episode "Once in a Lifetime," Nathan Stark is shown in a building with the name Stark Industries.
 In the Agents of S.H.I.E.L.D. episode "Nothing Personal," Maria Hill is shown working for Stark Industries after the events of Captain America: The Winter Soldier.
 Stark Expo is featured in a titular episode of Marvel's Spider-Man.
In the Marvel Cinematic Universe live-action series WandaVision,  the logo for Stark Industries is seen. S.W.O.R.D. uses a Stark Industries drone to power up and reactivate Vision.
In the Marvel Cinematic Universe live-action series The Falcon and The Winter Soldier, a bank teller asks Sam Wilson if Stark Industries provides financial support for him and the other Avengers, in which Wilson reveals it does not.
In the Marvel Cinematic Universe live-action series Hawkeye, Clint Barton owns a briefcase of Stark Industries arrowheads.

Film
In the Marvel Cinematic Universe, Stark Industries is headed by Tony Stark and has a significant influence in both the films and television series.

 In Iron Man, Stark Industries is featured with a logo similar to those of Northrop Grumman and Lockheed Martin, and touted as developing many of the same weapons systems that Lockheed Martin is/was responsible for developing, such as the F-22 Raptor and F-16 Fighting Falcon. After Tony's father Howard died, Obadiah Stane became the CEO and later abdicated when Tony was old enough to run it. After Stark comes back from Afghanistan, he announces that he is closing the weapons division of the company. After Stane confronts Stark about what percentage the company's stocks might fall both guess about forty percent. In the next scene Jim Cramer is seen on CNBC with a NYSE ticker tape at the bottom of the screen reading Stark Industries at 82.25 per share down by 56.50, a drop of about 40.7%.
 In The Incredible Hulk, Stark Industries logo flashes on the screen during the opening credit sequence when General Ross request to the company the Sonic Cannon that the army use against the Hulk later in the film and it is also on the Cyrosync container containing the Super Soldier Serum.
 In Iron Man 2, Virginia "Pepper" Potts became the CEO of the Stark Industries. Stark Industries, for the first time since 1974, hosted the renowned Stark Expo in Flushing Meadows. As a promotion for the film, at the 2009 San Diego Comic Con, Stark Industries recruiters handed out business cards with an invitation to apply for a job at Stark Industries by visiting StarkIndustriesNow.com. 
 In Captain America: The First Avenger, during World War II, a young Howard Stark assists the Strategic Scientific Reserve in their Super Soldier program, and provides key assistance to Steve Rogers and Agent Peggy Carter. The Stark Industries logo is modified to fit in with the 1940s time period.
 In The Avengers, Tony Stark opens the Stark Tower in New York City. After the Chitauri invasion, almost all the lettering forming the word 'STARK' on the side of the tower falls off, leaving only the 'A' - mirroring the logo of the Avengers that would replace the lettering later on.
 In Iron Man 3, Pepper is once again CEO of Stark Industries and Happy Hogan is the head of security. Happy calls out to an off-camera secretary named Bambi in reference to Bambi Arbogast.
 In Captain America: The Winter Soldier, Sam Wilson's winged flight gear is stated to have been designed by Stark Industries, as well as the redesigned Helicarriers' propulsion systems. When Hydra is revealed to be in control of S.H.I.E.L.D. and the new Helicarriers under Project Insight begin targeting millions, Tony Stark is one of their targets while inside the Avengers Tower. After S.H.I.E.L.D. is dissolved, Maria Hill is seen applying for a position at the Human Resources department of Stark Industries.
 In Avengers: Age of Ultron, Wanda and Pietro Maximoff call their childhood in the fictional nation of Sokovia, the apartment in which the Maximoff family was living was attacked with Stark Industries-manufactured mortar shells, killing their parents. This would prove to be the basis for their hatred of Stark.
 In Ant-Man, it is revealed that the Avengers Compound is a former Stark Industries warehouse.
 In Captain America: Civil War, Tony Stark makes a presentation at MIT to promote a Stark Industries program called the "September Foundation" to fund ideas for gifted and talented students. He later uses this program to lure Peter Parker to join the Avengers.
 In Spider-Man: Homecoming, it is revealed that the Department of Damage Control is a joint venture between Stark Industries and the U.S. government to clean up New York City in the aftermath of the invasion in 2012.
 In Spider-Man: Far From Home, a group of disgruntled former Stark Industries employees led by Quentin Beck create a fabricated superhero named Mysterio using Stark Industries drone and Beck's own BioAugmented Retrofitted Technology.
In Spider-Man: No Way Home, it is reported that a federal investigation into stolen Stark Industries technology  is underway following the Spider-Man and Mysterio controversy. The DODC subsequently investigate Stark Industries Headquarters. 
In Black Panther: Wakanda Forever, Shuri asks Riri Williams if she worked with Stark Industries to help her make her Ironheart armor.

Video games
 A billboard in Spider-Man on the level "Race to the Bugle" features a Stark Solutions logo and the slogan "Consulting in the Future." It was shown on the building just before the Daily Bugle building. A Stark Enterprise building can be seen in the level where Spider-Man chases Venom through New York City.
 Stark Industries appears in The Punisher video game. The Eternal Sun group raid the company to steal the Iron Man armors.
 In The Incredible Hulk video game, it was mentioned that Stark Industries built the Hulkbuster armors.
 A Stark Industries sign is visible in the opening cutscene for Marvel vs. Capcom 3: Fate of Two Worlds when Iron Man is battling Morrigan Aensland.
 In Spider-Man Shattered Dimensions, the 2099 universe makes repeated mention of Stark-Fujikawa on signs and over intercom announcements.
 In Spider-Man: Edge of Time Stark-Fujikawa is mentioned by Walter Sloan as a competitor to Alchemax.
 In Fortnite during Chapter 2: Season 4, Stark Industries was a mythic location on the map where players could receive items by eliminating Stark-Bots and Iron Man.

Theme parks
 Stark Industries is physically featured in Marvel Super Hero Island at the Islands of Adventure theme park, part of Universal Orlando Resort. It is also mentioned in the queue of The Amazing Adventures of Spider-Man ride in which it develops the SCOOP news-gathering vehicle for the Daily Bugle and the anti-gravity ray gun which it is stolen by the Sinister Syndicate who use the weapon to destroy parts of New York City and seize the Statue of Liberty to be held hostage as a leverage against the city.

 The Far East division of Stark Industries held a expo at Hong Kong Disneyland.

See also
 Alchemax
 Cross Technological Enterprises
 Oscorp
 Parker Industries
 Roxxon Energy Corporation

References

External links
 Stark Industries at Marvel Wiki
 Stark Industries at Comic Vine

shush

Iron Man